Peter Doerner (born 17 November 1950) is an Australian former professional tennis player.

Born in Sydney, Doerner played on the professional tour during the 1970s and featured in the main draw of all four grand slam tournaments. He was a two-time Australian Open quarter-finalist in doubles.

Doerner married tennis player Cynthia Sieler in 1972.

References

External links
 
 

1950 births
Living people
Australian male tennis players
Tennis players from Sydney
20th-century Australian people
21st-century Australian people